Bělá pod Pradědem is a municipality in Jeseník District in the Olomouc Region of the Czech Republic. It has about 1,700 inhabitants.

Administrative parts

The municipality is made up of villages of Adolfovice, Bělá, Domašov and Filipovice.

Etymology
The municipality gained its name after the Bělá river and the nearby Praděd mountain.

Geography

The Bělá River flows through the municipality, the villages are located in the valley of the river. The municipality lies in the Hrubý Jeseník mountains.

History
Both villages of Adolfovice and Domašov were first mentioned in 1284. Both villages were founded in the second half of the 13th century, during the colonization by the bishops of Wrocław, who owned the area. The villages were included within the ecclesiastical Duchy of Nysa, which, later on, passed under suzerainty of the Bohemian Crown. In 1772 the hamlet of Filipov/Philippsdorf was founded by bishop Philipp Gotthard von Schaffgotsch, and in 1796 the hamlet of Bělá/Waldenburg was founded by bishop Josepf Christian Franz zu Hohenlohe-Waldenburg-Bartenstein. Both hamlets were joined to Domašov in 1848.

In 1850, the duchy was secularized and dissolved, and the villages were incorporated directly to the Kingdom of Bohemia (Czechia). After World War I, since 1918, the area formed part of Czechoslovakia.

During World War II, the area was occupied by Germany. On 9 October 1939 Luftwaffe military Junkers F 13 (designation R 37/2) on its way from Opole to Olomouc crashed into the forest in Bělá pod Pradědem. All seven soldiers died in the accident and were buried at the cemetery in Domašov.

In Adolfovice, the occupiers operated three forced labour subcamps (E250, E334, E595) of the Stalag VIII-B/344 prisoner-of-war camp. After the war, in 1945, the German population was expelled in accordance with the Beneš decrees, and the area was restored to Czechoslovakia.

The municipality of Bělá pod Pradědem was established in 1961 by merger of municipalities of Adolfovice and Domašov, including the villages of Bělá and Filipovice.

Notable people
Josef Odložil (1938–1993), athlete, Olympic medalist; lived here

Twin towns – sister cities

Bělá pod Pradědem is twinned with:
 Tułowice, Poland

Gallery

References

External links

Villages in Jeseník District
Czech Silesia